Sofia Peak is the ice-covered peak rising to 1655 m in Levski Ridge, central Tangra Mountains on Livingston Island in the South Shetland Islands, Antarctica, 470 m northwest of the summit point of Great Needle Peak with which it forms a twin peak. The feature is named after the capital city of Bulgaria.

History
The first ascent and GPS survey of Sofia Peak was made on 8 January 2015 by the Bulgarian mountaineers Doychin Boyanov, Nikolay Petkov and Aleksander Shopov from Camp Academia locality (541 m) via Lozen Saddle (437 m) and Plana Peak (740 m).

Location
Bulgarian mapping in 2005, 2009 and 2017.

Maps
 L.L. Ivanov et al. Antarctica: Livingston Island and Greenwich Island, South Shetland Islands. Scale 1:100000 topographic map. Sofia: Antarctic Place-names Commission of Bulgaria, 2005
 L.L. Ivanov. Antarctica: Livingston Island and Greenwich, Robert, Snow and Smith Islands. Scale 1:120000 topographic map.  Troyan: Manfred Wörner Foundation, 2009
 L.L. Ivanov. Antarctica: Livingston Island and Smith Island. Scale 1:100000 topographic map. Manfred Wörner Foundation, 2017
 Antarctic Digital Database (ADD). Scale 1:250000 topographic map of Antarctica. Scientific Committee on Antarctic Research (SCAR). Since 1993, regularly upgraded and updated

Notes

References
 Sofia Peak. SCAR Composite Antarctic Gazetteer

Tangra Mountains